The 2006 Algarve Cup is the 13th edition of the Algarve Cup, an invitational women's football tournament held annually in Portugal. It took place 9–15 March 2006. Eleven teams participated in this edition of the Algarve Cup. Germany won the tournament defeating the USA, 4–3, in the final-game. Sweden ended up third defeating France, 1–0, in the third-prize game.

Format
The eleven teams are split into three groups that played a round-robin group stage, with 4 teams each in Group A and Group B, and 3 teams in Group C.  

The format for this edition of the Algarve Cup is as follows: Groups A and B, containing the strongest ranked teams, are the only ones in contention to win the title. The group A and B winners contest the final – to win the Algarve Cup. The runners-up play for third place, and those that finish third in the groups play for fifth place. The teams in Group C played for places 7–12. The winner of Group C played the team that finished fourth in Group A or B (whichever has the better record) for seventh place. The Group C runner-up played the team who finishes last in Group A or B (with the worse record) for ninth place. The team that finished last in Group C does not participate in the play-off stage.

Points awarded in the group stage followed the standard formula of three points for a win, one point for a draw and zero points for a loss. In the case of two teams being tied on the same number of points in a group, their head-to-head result determined the higher place.

Teams
The twelve invited teams were:

 Northern Ireland (77) was scheduled to be the fourth participant in Group C, but they withdrew and were replaced by Slovakia (43), who also withdrew.

Group stage

Group A

Group B

 France takes 2nd place in Group B via head-to-head result against China

Group C

Placement play-offs

Ninth place match

Seventh place match

Fifth place match

Third place match

Final

Final standings

References

External links
Algarve Cup on WomensSoccerUnited.com
RSSSF.com history page, with links to full results
Full results and history
https://www.thefinalball.com/edicao.php?id_edicao=54523

2006
Algarve Cup
Alg
March 2006 sports events in Europe
2006 in Portuguese women's sport